Rugby league is a minor sport in Germany.  The national governing body for the sport, Rugby League Deutschland, is an associate member of the Rugby League European Federation.  The country's national team are regular competitors in the European Shield, winning the competition in 2006 and 2011.

History

Rugby league was introduced into Germany in August 2004 with the formation of Rugby League Deutschland by Simon Cooper who was born in Halifax, England whose father is German. Prior to that it had been played informally by expat players associations such as British servicemen and students.

The first ever game didn't take place until nearly 12 months later when on 23 July the Heidelberg Sharks beat München RLFC 72-64 in a 9-a-side game played in Heidelberg. Since then clubs  Bad Reichenhall  and Innsbruck have also played matches.

In 2005 there was the first match between a Germany XIII and a touring Scottish Students side. This was a catalyst for Germany entering in 2006 in their first full international tournament the Central Europe Development Tri-Nations and then subsequently in the European Shield in 2007 and 2008.
In 2011, Rugby League Deutschland was admitted to affiliate membership of the Rugby League European Federation after reforms to its governance.

Popularity
The popularity of rugby league in Germany is small, and rugby of any form is still very much unknown by Germans. 80 adult players and around 200 children were introduced to the game in 2008.

Bundesland of Origin
In 2007 a State (Bundesland) of Origin style concept has also been introduced with two regional teams representing Bavaria and Central Germany. The weekend of this game is also used to bring everyone together for a training session and for the Coach and selectors to see all players in one place and also to have a meeting. The first such game was played in 2007 in Nürnberg.
 15 December - Bavaria 44-32 Central Germany - Nürnberg, Germany

National team

The current captain of the national side is Brad Billsborough and the coach is Bob Doughton.

As well as playing friendlies and one-off games, the German national team has participated in two tournaments. In the 2006 Germany participated in the Central Europe Development Tri-Nations along with Austria and Estonia. Germany won both of their matches narrowly beating Austria in Bad Reichenhall in front of over 350 people. They then travelled to Tallinn and beat Estonia to seal victory and outright first place of the competition.

In 2007 they took part in the RLEF European Shield along with the Czech Republic and Serbia. In this tournament they took out second place. They were beaten in Heidelberg by a strong Serbia side but recovered and beat a tough Czech Republic team in Prague by 22 points.

In 2008 Germany will once again be participating in the RLEF European Shield with the Czech Republic and newcomers Italy. Serbia were promoted to a group with Russia and Lebanon on their strong performance in 2007. The games will be held in Padova, Italy, Prague, Czech Republic and Frankfurt, Germany. There are also games proposed against Serbia and an RLEF XIII, but are yet to be confirmed.

The first weekend of August each year is being set aside for a game against the Czech Republic, no matter if facing each other in a tournament or not. Also plans are to have friendlies against Austria, though in 2007 this game fell through.

Results of the German National Team
Some results for Germany in Rugby League (XIII).

2005
 31 July - Germany XIII 13-28 Scottish Students - München, Germany
 7 August - Netherlands 34-28 Germany - Rotterdam, Netherlands

2006
Central Development Tri-Nations

 25 June - Germany 34-32 Austria - Bad Reichenhall, Germany
 22 July - Estonia 24-38 Germany - Tallinn, Estonia

2007
 16 June - Germany XIII 28-54 British Army - Osnabruk, Germany
RLEF European Shield Tri-Nations

 7 July - Germany 6-38 Serbia - Heidelberg Germany
 4 August - Czech Republic 22-44 Germany - Prague, Czech Republic

2008
RLEF European Shield Tri-Nations

 13 June - Italy 58-26 Germany - Padova Italy
 2 August - Germany 62-20 Czech Republic - Karlsruhe, Germany
Other games

 9 August - Germany 22-32 RLEF XIII - Bad Reichenhall, Germany
German State of Origin
 13/14 December - Central Germany vs. Bavaria - Nürnberg, Germany

Players that have represented Germany
At the moment the criteria for representing Germany is to have played in one of the domestic teams or the German Exiles. The current list is of staff and players that have played for Germany in the full internationals.

German National Team honours
 2006 - Central development Tri-Nations Champions. Germany's first piece of silver ware.
 2007 - 4 August. The Keinhorst brothers, Kristian, Markus, Jimmy and Nick set a new world record by being selected in the same game against the Czech Republic in Prague.

Board of Rugby League Deutschland

 President: Bob Doughton
 Vice-President: Uwe Jansen
 Director of Rugby: David Griffiths
 Treasurer: Leo Berngruber
 Secretary: Florian Rittner
 Other Board Members: Will Stocks, Dan Stocks, Bob Doughton
 Sponsors: Alpenstoff Beer, Hintsteiner Garage, Steeden

References

External links
Rugby League Deutschland website
Rugby League European Federation website
International Rugby League website

 
Sports leagues established in 2004